Anisogomphus is a genus of dragonfly in the family Gomphidae. 
It contains the following species:
Anisogomphus anderi 
Anisogomphus bivittatus 
Anisogomphus caudalis 
Anisogomphus chaoi 
Anisogomphus flavifacies 
Anisogomphus forresti 
Anisogomphus fujianensis 
Anisogomphus jinggangshanus 
Anisogomphus koxingai 
Anisogomphus maacki 
Anisogomphus nitidus 
Anisogomphus occipitalis 
Anisogomphus orites 
Anisogomphus pinratani 
Anisogomphus resortus 
Anisogomphus solitaris 
Anisogomphus vulvalis 
Anisogomphus wuzhishanus 
Anisogomphus yunnanensis

References

Gomphidae
Anisoptera genera
Taxa named by Edmond de Sélys Longchamps
Taxonomy articles created by Polbot